Francisco Éver Hernández Rodríguez (born December 11, 1958) is a retired football player from El Salvador who represented his country at the 1982 FIFA World Cup in Spain.

Club career
Hernández began his career playing for hometown club C.D Santiagueño with whom he won a domestic league title in 1980 but he left them after relegation for C.D. FAS,  winning another championship in 1984. He also clinched the top goalscorer award in 1984 with 17 goals. He retired early at only 28 years, after a final league season with Alianza.

International career
He became a hero after scoring a historical goal against Mexico to qualify El Salvador to the 1982 FIFA World Cup.

Hernández scored 13 goals for the El Salvador national football team from 1976 to 1985. He has represented his country in 11 FIFA World Cup qualification matches.

Retirement
After his career, Hernández moved to the United States in 1991 to become a car salesman in Los Angeles. He is married and has three children.

Honours
Primera División de Fútbol de El Salvador: 2
 1980, 1984

References

External links
 Biography - La Tribuna 

1958 births
Living people
People from Usulután Department
Association football forwards
Salvadoran footballers
1982 FIFA World Cup players
C.D. FAS footballers
Alianza F.C. footballers
El Salvador international footballers